Five ships of the French Navy have borne the name of Proserpine, in honour of Proserpina.

French ships named Proserpine 

 , a bomb ship, lead ship of her class
 , a fireship 
 , a  captured by the Royal Navy in the action of 13 June 1796 and taken in British service as HMS Amelia 
 , a Venetian galley
 , an  captured from the Royal Navy in the action of 27 February 1809

See also

Notes and references

Notes

References

Bibliography 
 

French Navy ship names